The 2021 Michelin Pilot Challenge is the twenty-second season of the IMSA SportsCar Challenge and the eighth season organized by the International Motor Sports Association (IMSA).

Classes 
 Grand Sport (GS) (run to GT4 regulations)
 Touring Car (TCR)

Calendar 
The 2021 schedule was released on September 9, 2020 and features ten rounds.

Entry list

Grand Sport

Touring Car

Race results 
Bold indicates overall winner.
{|class="wikitable" style="font-size:85%;"
!rowspan=2| Round
!rowspan=2| Circuit
! GS Winning Car
! TCR Winning Car
|-
! GS Winning Drivers
! TCR Winning Drivers
|-
!rowspan=2| 1
|rowspan=2| Daytona
|  #13 AWA
|  #17 JDC-Miller MotorSports
|-
|  Orey Fidani Kuno Wittmer
|  Chris Miller William Tally Mikey Taylor
|-
!rowspan=2| 2
|rowspan=2| Sebring
|  #71 Rebel Rock Racing
|  #61 Road Shagger Racing
|-
|  Frank DePew Robin Liddell
|  Gavin Ernstone Jonathan Morley
|-
!rowspan=2| 3
|rowspan=2| Mid-Ohio
|  #13 AWA|  #98 Bryan Herta Autosport with Curb-Agajanian
|-
|  Chris Green Kuno Wittmer|  Parker Chase Ryan Norman
|-
!rowspan=2| 4
| rowspan="4" | Watkins Glen
|  #23 Notlad Racing by RS1|  #94 Atlanta Speedwerks
|-
|  Patrick Gallagher Stevan McAleer|  Ryan Eversley Todd Lamb
|-
!rowspan=2| 5
|  #95 Turner Motorsport|  #84 Atlanta Speedwerks
|-
|  Bill Auberlen Dillon Machavern|  Brian Henderson Robert Noaker
|-
!rowspan=2| 6
|rowspan=2| Lime Rock
|  #56 Murillo Racing|  #77 Bryan Herta Autosport with Curb-Agajanian
|-
|  Eric Foss Jeff Mosing|  Michael Lewis Taylor Hagler
|-
!rowspan=2| 7
|rowspan=2| Road America
| #95 Turner Motorsport| #5 KMW Motorsports with TMR Engineering
|-
| Bill Auberlen Dillon Machavern| Roy Block Tim Lewis Jr.
|-
!rowspan=2| 8
|rowspan=2| Laguna Seca
| #16 Wright Motorsports|  #33 Bryan Herta Autosport with Curb-Agajanian
|-
| Jan Heylen Max Root|  Harry Gottsacker Mark Wilkins
|-
!rowspan=2| 9
|rowspan=2| Virginia
| #16 Wright Motorsports|  #17 JDC-Miller MotorSports
|-
| Jan Heylen Ryan Hardwick|  Chris Miller Mikey Taylor
|-
!rowspan=2| 10
|rowspan=2| Road Atlanta
| #16 Wright Motorsports| #5 KMW Motorsports with TMR Engineering
|-
| Jan Heylen Ryan Hardwick| Roy Block Tim Lewis Jr.
|}

 Championship standings 

 Points systems 
Championship points are awarded in each class at the finish of each event. Points are awarded based on finishing positions in the race as shown in the chart below.

 Drivers points

Points are awarded in each class at the finish of each event.

 Team points

Team points are calculated in exactly the same way as driver points, using the point distribution chart. Each car entered is considered its own "team" regardless if it is a single entry or part of a two-car team.

 Manufacturer points

There are also a number of manufacturer championships which utilize the same season-long point distribution chart. The manufacturer championships recognized by IMSA are as follows:

 Grand Sport (GS): Car manufacturer
 Touring Car (TCR):''' Car manufacturer

Each manufacturer receives finishing points for its highest finishing car in each class. The positions of subsequent finishing cars from the same manufacturer are not taken into consideration, and all other manufacturers move up in the order.

 Example: Manufacturer A finishes 1st and 2nd at an event, and Manufacturer B finishes 3rd. Manufacturer A receives 35 first-place points while Manufacturer B would earn 32 second-place points.

Driver's Championships

Standings: Grand Sport (GS)

Standings: Touring Car (TCR)

Team's Championships

Standings: Grand Sport (GS)

Standings: Touring Car (TCR)

Manufacturer's Championships

Standings: Grand Sport (GS)

Standings: Touring Car (TCR)

References

External links 
 Official website

Michelin Pilot Challenge
Michelin Pilot Challenge
Michelin Pilot Challenge